Filip Čuić (born 22 February 2003)  is a Bosnian professional footballer who plays as a forward for NK Radomlje in the Slovenian PrvaLiga on loan from Hajduk Split, and Bosnian U21 national team.

Club career 
Filip Čuić was born in Split, but raised in Brišnik, a village in the municipality of Tomislavgrad, Bosnia and Herzegovina. He started his football career at local club Tomislav. He moved to neighbouring Croatia in late 2018, first joining the U-17 team of NK Dugopolje until the end of the season, before joining the youth academy of the famed Dalmatian club Hajduk Split in 2019, where his older brother Mario was already playing.

Featuring in two Hajduk Split U19 national titles, Čuić was shortlisted for the 2021–22 UEFA Youth League top player award, having scored 6 goals in 5 matches in the competition.

In 2022, Čuić was initially signed to a double registration with second-tier NK Solin, but, with Ivan Ćalušić having been pulled from his loan at the Slovenian top-tier side NK Radomlje , having picked up a injury requiring an operation, Čuić was sent there in his stead, joining his brother Mario as well. At Radomlje Čuić made his first senior league cap, coming in for Nedim Hadžić in the 78th minute of the October 2nd 2022 2-1 away loss to NK Celje.

Featuring prolifically for the Bosnia and Herzegovina U19 team in the previous season, in November 2022, Čuić was called up for the Bosnia and Herzegovina U21 national football team.

See also
Edin Džeko

References

External links
Filip Čuić at Soccerway

2003 births
Living people
People from Tomislavgrad
Association football forwards
Bosnia and Herzegovina footballers
Bosnia and Herzegovina youth international footballers
HNK Hajduk Split players
NK Radomlje players
Slovenian PrvaLiga players
Bosnia and Herzegovina expatriate footballers
Expatriate footballers in Slovenia